In recreational mathematics, a polyform is a plane figure or solid compound constructed by joining together identical basic polygons. The basic polygon is often (but not necessarily) a convex plane-filling polygon, such as a square or a triangle. More specific names have been given to polyforms resulting from specific basic polygons, as detailed in the table below. For example, a square basic polygon results in the well-known polyominoes.

Construction rules
The rules for joining the polygons together may vary, and must therefore be stated for each distinct type of polyform. Generally, however, the following rules apply:
Two basic polygons may be joined only along a common edge, and must share the entirety of that edge.
No two basic polygons may overlap.
A polyform must be connected (that is, all one piece; see connected graph, connected space). Configurations of disconnected basic polygons do not qualify as polyforms.
The mirror image of an asymmetric polyform is not considered a distinct polyform (polyforms are "double sided").

Generalizations
Polyforms can also be considered in higher dimensions. In 3-dimensional space, basic polyhedra can be joined along congruent faces. Joining cubes in this way produces the polycubes, and joining tetrahedrons in this way produces the polytetrahedrons. 2-dimensional polyforms can also be folded out of the plane along their edges, in similar fashion to a net; in the case of polyominoes, this results in polyominoids.

One can allow more than one basic polygon. The possibilities are so numerous that the exercise seems pointless, unless extra requirements are brought in. For example, the Penrose tiles define extra rules for joining edges, resulting in interesting polyforms with a kind of pentagonal symmetry.

When the base form is a polygon that tiles the plane, rule 1 may be broken. For instance, squares may be joined orthogonally at vertices, as well as at edges, to form hinged/pseudo-polyominos, also known as polyplets or polykings.

Types and applications
Polyforms are a rich source of problems, puzzles and games. The basic combinatorial problem is counting the number of different polyforms, given the basic polygon and the construction rules, as a function of n, the number of basic polygons in the polyform.

See also 
Polycube
Polyomino
Polyominoid

References

External links

The Poly Pages at RecMath.org, illustrations and information on many kinds of polyforms.